Namibe Partial Reserve is a protected area in Angola. It is located to the north of Iona National Park, and separated by a narrow strip of occupied land along the Curoca River. This reserve has IUCN Category IV status and was proclaimed in 1960 by the authorities of Portuguese Angola. This park is planned to be included into the Iona - Skeleton Coast Transfrontier Conservation Area.

Large sand dunes can be seen here, because the reserve is located in a desert area. Therefore, only plants resistant to this cruel environment can be found, such as Welwitschia mirabilis, better known as the "desert octopus."

Mammals such as the elephant, kudu, oryx, black rhino and mountain zebra Hartmanns have previously appeared in the area, but their current status is uncertain.

See also

References

Protected areas of Angola